Austria participated in the ninth Winter Paralympics in Turin, Italy.

Team 

Austria entered 25 athletes in the following sports:

Alpine skiing: 20 male, 3 female
Nordic skiing: 2 male

Medalists

See also
2006 Winter Paralympics
Austria at the 2006 Winter Olympics

External links
Torino 2006 Paralympic Games
International Paralympic Committee
Österreichisches Paralympisches Committee

2006
Nations at the 2006 Winter Paralympics
Winter Paralympics